Sir Frank Forbes Adam, 1st Baronet  (17 June 1846 – 22 December 1926) was a British banker who made his fortune in British India.  He was President of the Bank of Bombay.

He was educated at Loretto School.

He was appointed Companion of the Order of the Indian Empire (CIE) in 1888, and (Knight Bachelor) in 1890. Appointed a deputy lieutenant of Lancashire on 26 April 1904, Forbes was created Baronet of Hankelow Court, Chester in 1917 and appointed Companion of the Order of the Bath in 1919.

He married Rose Frances, daughter of Charles Gordon Kemball, a  judge of the High Court of Bombay.  They had three sons and a daughter:

 Sir Ronald Forbes Adam, 2nd Baronet GCB, DSO, OBE (1885–1982), British army general.
 Eric Forbes Adam CMG (1888–1925), diplomat
 Colin Gurden Forbes Adam CSI (1889–1982), civil servant
 Hetty Reay Clifford Forbes Adam MBE (1896–1970).

References

Companions of the Order of the Indian Empire
Companions of the Order of the Bath
Knights Bachelor
Baronets in the Baronetage of the United Kingdom
Deputy Lieutenants of Lancashire
People educated at Loretto School, Musselburgh
1846 births
1926 deaths
Members of the Bombay Legislative Council